Gomoa Mpota is a town in the Central Region of Ghana.

References

Populated places in the Central Region (Ghana)